Bourbon Patch Bondurant (February 18, 1898 - September 4, 1971) was a professional American football player during the early 1920s. He played in the early National Football League for the Evansville Crimson Giants and the Chicago Bears. Before joining the Evansville Crimson Giants Bondurant worked as an insurance agent. He had previously played professional football with the Fort Wayne Friars.

Bourbon played at the college level for DePauw University and was the team's captain in 1917.

References

Pro Football Archives
1917 DePauw Tigers Team

1898 births
1971 deaths
Players of American football from Kentucky
Chicago Bears players
Evansville Crimson Giants players
DePauw Tigers football players
Fort Wayne Friars players